A commission of array was a commission given by English sovereigns to officers or gentry in a given territory to muster and array the inhabitants and to see them in a condition for war, or to put soldiers of a country in a condition for military service. The term arrayers is used in some ancient English statutes, for an officer who had a commission of array.

History
Commissions of array developed from the ancient obligation of all free men to defend their tribal lands. Commissioners were usually experienced soldiers, appointed by the crown to array able bodied men from each shire. By the time of the Wars of the Roses, conscript levies were less important than troops raised by indenture.

Medieval examples

Commission from Glendower rebellion 1403
A Commission of Array was established in October 1403 by King Henry IV by letters patent to raise an army to resist the Welsh rebellion of Owain Glyndŵr, who had recently captured Newport Castle. The commission issued by the king at Gloucester on 7 October 1403 to leading members of the local gentry was as follows:
Commission to Maurice Russell, Gilbert Dynys, John Rolves and John Harsefelde to assemble all the able fencible men, footmen and horsemen, of the hundreds of Barton Regis by Bristol, Hembury, Pokelchurche, Thornbury, Grymboldesasshe, Berkeley and Whiston and bring them sufficiently armed to the town of Chepstowe by Thursday next at the latest to go with the King or his lieutenant to Wales to resist the rebels bringing with them victuals for 4 days and to take horses from those who have them who cannot labour and deliver them to those who can labour but lack horses. By K.

Commission for St Michaels Mount in Cornwall, 1473
On 27 October 1473 Commission to John Arundell, knight, John Colshyll, knight, Robert Willoughby, knight, John Crocker, knight, John Fortescue, Henry Bodrugan, John Sturgeon, Thomas Whalisburgh, John Trenowith, Thomas Trefrye, John Arundell, John Tremayne, John Carmynowe Richard Eggecombe, John Devyok, Oliver Wyse, Edward Assheton, John Pentyre, John Moyle, William TreTenoar, John Penpons, John Wydeslade the younger and William Horde to array the king's lieges of the county of Cornwall, and of other counties adjacent if necessary, to conquer John, late earl of Oxford, and. other rebels who have entered St. Michael's Mount, CO. Cornwall, and to bring back the mount into the king's hands and provide for its safe-custody and defence.

Civil War revival
Although long obsolete by the 17th century, the system was revived by King Charles I in 1642 at the start of the Civil War, in an unconstitutional manner, that is to say without Parliament having been consulted, in order to counteract the equally unconstitutional Militia Ordinance enacted by Parliament in 1642 without the usual Royal Assent. Both decrees were issued in order to attempt to gain control of existing militia forces and to raise further troops. The Commission of Array issued by the king thus sought to muster a Royalist army at the onset of the English Civil War. Commissioners were appointed for each county, generally from leading members of the local aristocracy and gentry who might be assumed to wield great influence over their feudal tenants and the population in general. The commissioners  proceeded to the major population centres and read out in public gatherings the text of their commission. Frequently such innovative royal decrees, uncertain in precedent and purpose, were met with open hostility on the part of the local inhabitants who suspected them as being instruments designed for general suppression of the people. Opponents of the king, whilst playing down the role of the Militia Ordinance in augmenting civil strife, portrayed the Commission of Array as being a sign that it was the king and not Parliament who was the real aggressor in the developing conflict.

Devon

28 Commissioners of Array were appointed in Devon on 19 July 1642, including:
Henry Bourchier, 5th Earl of Bath
Edward Chichester, 1st Viscount Chichester
George Southcote of Buckland Tout Saints, appointed but apparently never acted as he was appointed Sheriff of Devon during the Commonwealth, father of Thomas Southcote (c. 1622–1664), of Buckland Tout Saints, MP.
Sir John Acland, 1st Baronet (c. 1591–1647)

See also
 Posse comitatus

References

Bibliography
1828 Webster's Dictionary

English Civil War
Military history of the United Kingdom
Military command staff occupations